The page lists diplomatic missions in Kurdistan Region, autonomous region of Iraq. First fully accredited consulates general was opened by Iran and Russia in 2007. Currently, 30 countries have official representation in Kurdistan Region, while Belarus, Cyprus, Denmark, Slovakia, Spain, Sri Lanka have honorary consulates.

All representations are in Erbil. Only Iran has a consulate general also in Sulaymaniyah.

The list does not include honorary consulates nor countries that have expressed interest or plans in opening a representation.

Consulates General

 (Erbil & Sulaymaniyah)

Consulates

 (Consular office)
 (Consular office)

Representative offices
 (Commercial office)
 (Commercial office)
 (Embassy office)
 (Delegation office)
 (Embassy office)

Missions
 International Committee of the Red Cross (Regional office)
 Japan International Cooperation Agency (Office)
 Korea International Cooperation Agency (Representative office)
 United Nations Assistance Mission for Iraq (Regional representation office)

See also
Foreign relations of Kurdistan Region
List of diplomatic missions of Kurdistan Region

Notes

References

External links
Current International Offices in the Kurdistan Region

Diplomatic missions
Kurdistan Region
Diplomatic missions in Kurdistan Region